Reagan Wickens (born 16 December 1994) is an Australian swimmer. He was selected to represent Australia at the 2012 Summer Paralympics in swimming, but did not medal.

Personal
Wickens was born on 16 December 1994 and is from Grays Point, New South Wales. He has three brothers. He has Achondraplasia.  he attends St Patrick's College, Sutherland where he was in year 12.

Swimming

Wickens is an S6 classified swimmer. Reagan started swimming at his local pool, Sutherland leisure centre, at a young age and first competed at the age of 10 in school carnivals. He competed at the 2009 Youth Paralympics in four different swimming strokes, and taking home five medals, one of which was gold. He competed at the 2011 New South Wales Multi Class Championships, where he competed in three events and finished first in all of them.  That year, he also competed Para-Pan Pacific Championships where he earned four silver medals and two gold medals. He was selected to represent Australia at the 2012 Summer Paralympics in swimming in the 400 m Freestyle, 50 m Butterfly, 50 m Freestyle, 200 m Individual medley, 100 m Backstroke and 100 m Freestyle. He left for Wales for a team training camp on 10 August 2012 before the start of the Games. He did not medal at the 2012 Games.

At the 2015 IPC Swimming World Championships, Glasgow, Scotland, he finished seventh in the Men's 400m Freestyle S6, twelfth in the Men's 50m Butterfly S6, Men's 100m Freestyle S6, and Men's 200m Individual Medley SM6 and Men's 100m Backstroke S6.

Personal bests

References

Living people
Male Paralympic swimmers of Australia
Swimmers at the 2012 Summer Paralympics
1994 births
Sportsmen from New South Wales
S6-classified Paralympic swimmers
Australian male freestyle swimmers
Australian male butterfly swimmers
Australian male medley swimmers
20th-century Australian people
21st-century Australian people